Jens Kehlet Nørskov  (born September 21, 1952, in Denmark) is the Villum Kann Rasmussen professor at the Technical University of Denmark. He is a Danish physicist most notable for his work on theoretical description of surfaces, catalysis, materials, nanostructures, and biomolecules.

Education 
Nørskov earned his MSc in Physics and Chemistry in 1976 and his PhD in Theoretical Physics in 1979 from the University of Aarhus Denmark under B. I. Lundqvist.

Academic career 
Nørskov is known for his theoretical work on description of surfaces, catalysis, materials, nanostructures, and biomolecules. His work on computer-based heterogeneous catalysis has in several instances led to the development of new ideas for catalysts for e.g. ammonia synthesis and fuel-cells.  He holds honorary doctorates from the Eindhoven University of Technology, the Norwegian University of Science and Technology (NTNU), and from the Technical University of Munich (TUM). He is a member of the Royal Danish Academy of Sciences and Letters, the Danish Academy of Engineering, Academia Europaea and a foreign member of the US National Academy of Engineering.

Following his PhD, he served as a research fellow, postdoctoral associate and staff scientist at various institutions – including IBM T.J. Watson Research Center, and Haldor Topsoe. In 1987, Norskov began serving as a research professor at Technical University of Denmark and was named professor of theoretical physics in 1992.  In June 2010, he moved to Stanford University to become the Leland T. Edwards Professor of Chemical Engineering and the Founding Director of the SUNCAT Center for Interface Science and Catalysis. In July 2018, he moved back to the Technical University of Denmark to hold the Villum Kann Rasmussen Chair. Nørskov is currently the chair of the Danish National Research Foundation.

Personal life 
Jens Nørskov is married to Bodil.

Books 

Fundamental Concepts in Heterogeneous Catalysis, Jens Nørskov, Felix Studt, Frank Abild-Pedersen, Thomas Bligaard.
Chemical Bonding at Surfaces and Interfaces, edited by Anders Nilsson, Lars G.M. Pettersson, Jens Nørskov.
Fuel Cell Science: Theory, Fundamentals, and Biocatalysis, edited by Andrzej Wieckowski, Jens Nørskov.

Honours and awards
2018: Niels Bohr International Gold Medal
2018: ETH Zurich Chemical Engineering Medal 
2016: European Inventor Award
2016: Murray Ramsey Award 
2015: The Carlsberg Foundation Research Prize 
2015: Rigmor and Carl Holst-Knudsen's Science Prize 
2015: Irving Langmuir Prize in Chemical Physics
2014: Michel Boudart Award for the Advancement of Catalysis 
2013: Hagemann Medal
2011: Giuseppe Parravano Memorial Award for Excellence in Catalysis Research 
2009: Alwin Mittasch Award (jointly)
2009: Gerhard Ertl Lecture Award 
2009: Gabor A. Somorjai Award for Creative Research in Catalysis 
2009: Science of Hydrogen and Energy Award 
2007: Grundfos Prize
2007: Mulliken medal
2007: Innovation Prize
2003: Elected Fellow of the American Physical Society
2003: Richard A. Glenn Award
1991: Villum Kann Rasmussen's Award
1990: Danish Physical Society's Prize
1989: Samuel Friedman (Rescue) Award
1987: Reinholdt W. Jorch's Award
1979: ECOSS prize

References

External links 
 

1952 births
Living people
Stanford University School of Engineering faculty
Stanford University SLAC faculty
Aarhus University alumni
Foreign associates of the National Academy of Engineering
Fellows of the American Physical Society